George Washington (born 1830) was a  cotton planter and state legislator in the U.S. state of Louisiana. He represented Concordia Parish in the Louisiana House of Representatives from 1870 to 1874 and from 1877 to 1879. He also served on the parish's school board in 1870. He served on the House Committee on Public Lands and Levees chaired by P. Jones Yorke.

In 1872, he and David Young were elected to represent Concordia Parish.

See also
African-American officeholders during and following the Reconstruction era

References

Members of the Louisiana State Legislature
1830 births
Year of death missing